Kampia may refer to several villages in Cyprus and Greece:

Kampia, Chania, a village in the Chania regional unit, Crete
Kampia, Euboea, a village in Euboea
Kampia, Chios, a village on Chios
Kampia, Phthiotis, a village in Phthiotis
Kampia, Cyprus, a village near Pera Orinis